The 1927 Humboldt State Lumberjacks football team represented Humboldt State College during the 1927 college football season. They competed as an independent. The 1927 season was their third season of existence and was the first one where they played against another college. In the 1924 and 1925 seasons they had only played against high school teams and the school did not field a team in 1926.

The 1927 Lumberjacks were led by first-year head coach Fred Telonicher. Telonicher was the third head coach for the Lumberjacks in as many seasons. They played home games in Eureka, California. Humboldt State finished with a record of one win and two losses (1–2). The Lumberjacks outscored their opponents 41–37 in the three games.

Schedule

Notes

References

Humboldt State
Humboldt State Lumberjacks football seasons
Humboldt State Lumberjacks football